Schofield Normal and Industrial School was a school for African Americans in Aiken, South Carolina. It is now a public middle school.

The school was founded by the Freedmen's Bureau in 1866. Martha Schofield, a Quaker from Pennsylvania became its superintendent. It became a boarding school and taught trades and trained teachers. It was merged into the public school system in 1952. It was integrated in the 1960s and became a middle school.

Isaac Fisher taught at the school. Nick Aaron Ford taught at the school.

Martha Schofield was also a political activist. She wrote to her sister on school stationary.

Sanford P. Brady, an alumnus of the school, became its first African American superintendent. A belltower from the school that topped its Carter Hall is extant. A historical marker commemorates the school's history. Friends Historical Library of Swarthmore College has a collection of papers from the school. The school is part of the Reconstruction Era National Historic Network.

Schofield Middle School
Schofield Middle School is a public school in Aiken. It is on Sumter Street. As of 2021, more than half the student body is African American.

References

Schools in Aiken County, South Carolina
Educational institutions established in 1866
1866 establishments in South Carolina
Schools supported by the Freedmen's Bureau
Historically segregated African-American schools in South Carolina